Beatrice Sumner Thompson (1874–1938) was an American suffragist and activist.

Biography
Thompson was born in Boston, Massachusetts on May 4, 1874. Her family moved to Denver, Colorado in 1880. In 1891 she graduated from Denver High and went on to a clerical and bookkeeping career starting at the Arapahoe County treasurer's office. 

Around 1900 Thompson relocated to Los Angeles, California with her family. She was there a short time before she married Samuel William Thompson with whom she had two children. The couple settled in Chicago, Illinois. Beatrice returned to Los Angeles in 1905 and Samuel joined her around 1909. Thompson was an active Los Angeles clubwoman. She was a member of the Women's Civic and Protective League,  National Association for the Advancement of Colored People (NAACP), specifically the Los Angeles branch, and the Colored Division of the Los Angeles Branch of the California War History Committee. Thompson became executive secretary of the Los Angeles NAACP in 1917 and served in that position though 1925. During this time Thompson was also an advocate for women's suffrage and education for the African American community. She went on to become active in the South End Republican Club. 

In the 1920 the Thompsons separated, leaving Beatrice in reduced circumstances. Her daughter Anita had a notable career as an actress and model. Beatrice Sumner Thompson died on February 14, 1938, in Los Angeles.

References

1874 births
1938 deaths
American suffragists
People from Boston
People from Denver